Jamestown Settlement is a living history museum operated by the Commonwealth of Virginia, created in 1957 as Jamestown Festival Park for the 350th anniversary celebration. Today it includes a recreation of the original James Fort (c. 1607 to 1614), a Powhatan Native American town, indoor and outdoor displays, and replicas of the original settlers' ships: the Susan Constant, Godspeed, and Discovery.

The museum complex is located adjacent to Historic Jamestowne, on Jamestown Island, which is run in partnership by the National Park Service and the Jamestown Rediscovery Foundation, a private nonprofit branch of Preservation Virginia dedicated to the archaeological mission. Historic Jamestowne is established in the original James Fort and Jamestown Colony, the first successful English settlement on the mainland of North America, founded on May 14, 1607. Colonial Williamsburg and The American Revolution Museum in Yorktown, additional living history sites, follow the next centennial of Virginian and American history up to the American Civil War. The Colonial Parkway connects all of these sites. The Jamestown-Yorktown Foundation is a Virginia state agency that administers the education aspects the Jamestown Settlement as well as the Yorktown battlefield and the Revolution.

Background
Late in the 18th century, Jamestown became the focus of renewed historical interest and efforts at preservation. In 1893, a portion of the island was donated to Preservation Virginia for that purpose, including the ruined church tower. In the early 1900s, a seawall was constructed with the intention of preserving the site around the original "James Fort", even though the actual location of the original 1607 fort was thought to be underwater and lost to erosion. In 1907, the Jamestown Exposition was held to mark the 300th anniversary of the founding of Jamestown, but the celebration was held at Sewell's Point in Norfolk, Virginia on the harbor of Hampton Roads, due to transportation and other considerations. The area came back into national prominence with the creation of the Colonial National Historical Park in 1940 and the uncovering of the old fort in 1996 by archaeologists of the Jamestown Rediscovery project.

Jamestown Festival Park

A return to Jamestown itself was considered feasible by 1957, in time for the 350th anniversary of the founding of the London Company settlement at Jamestown. Attractions were developed by the US National Park Service and the Commonwealth of Virginia which included the reconstructed Glasshouse, the Memorial Cross, and the visitors center. The National Park Service's Colonial Parkway was also completed in April 1957 linking the Historic Triangle of Jamestown, Williamsburg, and Yorktown, including the construction of a land bridge to Jamestown Island.

The 1956 celebrations continued from April 1 to November 30 with more than one million participants, including dignitaries and politicians such as the British Ambassador and U.S. Vice President Richard Nixon. Full-sized replicas were constructed of the three ships that brought the colonists: the Susan Constant, Godspeed, and Discovery. They were built at a shipyard in Portsmouth, Virginia and relocated to nearby Glass House Point for the festival. There nearly 25,000 visitors at the Festival Park on October 16, 1957, and the highlight for many was the visit and speech of Queen Elizabeth II and Prince Philip. Queen Elizabeth lent a copy of Magna Carta for the exhibition. Other events in 1957 included army and navy reviews, air force flyovers, ship and aircraft christenings, and an outdoor drama at Cape Henry, site of the first landing of the settlers in April 1607.

400th anniversary
Jamestown Settlement facilities and programs were greatly expanded early in the 21st century as part of the Jamestown 2007 quadricentennial celebration. A special exhibition named "The World of 1607" was created to showcase 17th century Virginia and featured rare artifacts that were on loan from international collections and major museums. Additionally, new permanent exhibits were added while existing materials were refreshed, and a new introductory film was added. Her majesty, Queen Elizabeth II and the Duke of Edinburgh were invited and attended the Jamestown Settlement on May 14, 2005 as part of a two-day royal visit to Virginia. Their itinerary included visits to the state capital in Richmond, Virginia, Colonial Williamsburg, and Historic Jamestown. Approximately 1,200 invited guests, educational groups, and members of the community were in attendance. The celebration of Jamestown was held in Jamestown, Virginia.

Attractions

Galleries
The Jamestown Settlement galleries provide the setting for a varied collection of objects relating to the nation’s beginnings in 17th-century Virginia. The Jamestown-Yorktown Foundation collection has been developed to support the museum’s storyline and includes objects representative of the Powhatan Indian, European, and African cultures that converged in 1600s Virginia. More than 500 artifacts are exhibited at any one time in the galleries.

Living History
In Living History, visitors can "journey to the past" in re-creations of a Powhatan Indian town and the 1610-14 colonial fort.  The park also allows visitors to board replicas of the three ships that sailed from England to Virginia in 1607. In the outdoor areas, costumed historical interpreters describe and demonstrate daily life in early 17th century Jamestown.

Events
Regular events are held to link with the colonial-related themes of the area - such as military re-enactments, historic trades fairs, lectures, or anniversaries. The next major event is the 410th Anniversary of the founding of the settlement, scheduled for mid-May 2017, entitled Jamestown Day. Similarly, Pocahontas Imagined will commemorate the 400th Anniversary of the death of Pocahontas in July 2017. Further, the American Indian Intertribal Powwow will be held there in October 2017.

Surrounds
On nearby Jamestown Island itself, the National Park Service and Preservation Virginia, operate Historic Jamestowne where a vast amount of artifacts have been recovered by the Jamestown Rediscovery project with ongoing archaeological work, including ongoing excavations, reconstructions, and renovations (e.g., Jamestown Church). It is also next to the Jamestown Glasshouse.

Gallery

See also
Jamestown, Virginia
Historic Jamestowne
History of the Jamestown Settlement (1607–1701)

Notes

External links 

 Jamestown Settlement Official Webpage

Museums in James City County, Virginia
Open-air museums in Virginia
Living museums in Virginia
Jamestown, Virginia
Museums established in 1957
Institutions accredited by the American Alliance of Museums
1957 establishments in Virginia